The Executed Renaissance (or "Red Renaissance") is a term used to describe the generation of Ukrainian language poets, writers, and artists of the 1920s and early 1930s who lived in the Ukrainian Socialist Soviet Republic and were subsequently persecuted, denied work, imprisoned and, in dozens of cases, shot during the Great Terror (August 1937 – November 1938).

After the Great Turn in 1929 or "Great Breakthrough" (cf. Mao's Great Leap Forward), the Soviet leader, CPSU Secretary General Joseph Stalin reversed the post-1917 Bolshevik Revolution policies of Korenizatsiya and Ukrainianization. Outwardly pro-Soviet, poets and writers in Ukraine refused to submit to Stalin's restoration of the Tsarist policy of the coercive Russification of Ukraine. Poets, writers and dramatists who wrote in the Ukrainian language were arrested en masse and then deported, imprisoned or executed. In many cases they were shot at Sandarmokh, the mass execution and burial site in northwest Karelia, after being transported there from the Solovki prison camp in the White Sea.

"The Executed Renaissance" was a term first suggested in 1959 by anti-communist Polish émigré publisher Jerzy Giedroyc of the influential Kultura magazine. He was writing to Ukrainian émigré and literary critic Yuriy Lavrinenko about the title of a planned anthology of the best Ukrainian literature of that generation.

Background 
The collapse of the Russian Empire during the First World War, the abolition of imperial censorship, the establishment of an independent Ukrainian State, and the cultural leniency of the Soviet regime in the 1920s together led to an astonishing renaissance of literary and cultural activities in Ukraine. Scores of new writers and poets appeared and formed dozens of literary groups that changed the face of Ukrainian literature. These processes were supported by the policies of nativization (in Ukraine it was called Ukrainization), the New Economic Policy of State Capitalism (1921–1927), and the drive to eliminate illiteracy.

As a title 
The term the “Executed Renaissance” was first proposed in 1959 by Jerzy Giedroyc, editor of Kultura publishers in Paris, which was devoted to publishing anti-communist writers from throughout the Polish diaspora. In a 13 August 1958 letter to Yuriy Lavrinenko, Giedroyc referred to an anthology of recent Ukrainian literature which Lavrinenko had prepared at Giedroyc's request: 
"About the name. Could it be better to give it a generic name: Executed Renaissance. Anthology 1917–1933 etc. The name would then sound spectacular. On the other hand, the humble name Anthology can only facilitate penetration by the Iron Curtain. What do you think?"

"So be it," replied Lavrinenko.

The book The Executed Renaissance, An Anthology, 1917–1933: Poetry, prose, drama and the essay, published in Paris by Kultura (1959), remains one of the most important sources for the history of Ukrainian literature during the period. It includes the best examples of Ukrainian poetry, prose and essay-writing from the 1920s and early 1930s.

According to Ukrainian literary historian Yarina Tsymbal, The Executed Renaissance was "a good name for the anthology, but unsuitable for the whole generation of creative intelligentsia." In her view, the "Red Renaissance" is a more apt metaphor because it was a self-description. The latter term first appeared in 1925 when Olexander Leites' book The Renaissance of Ukrainian Literature and the poem "The Call of the Red Renaissance" by Volodymyr Gadzinskyi were published simultaneously and independently. That same year, the magazine Neo-Lif appeared with a preface by Gadzinskyi: "For us the past is only a means of cognizing the present and future," he wrote, "a useful experience and an important practice in the great structure of the Red Renaissance."

A new elite 
Lavrinenko, however, saw "the Executed Renaissance" as more than just the title of an anthology. He promoted it as a term encapsulating the martyrdom of Ukrainian poets and their legacy and power to resurrect Ukrainian culture. The Executed Renaissance paradigm, together with the national-communist perspective and as a framework for the nationalization of  Ukraine's early Soviet intellectuals, would later emerge as part of an effort to establish a national opposition to the Communist regime with the new intellectual elite eventually contributing to a struggle for an independent and united country.

The main elements in the outlook of the new Ukrainian intellectuals were rebellion, independent thought, and genuine belief in their own ideals. The intellectuals emphasised the individual rather than the masses. Like many other proponents of inner emigration in a police state, their outward "Sovietness" concealed deep searches and queries.

Arising from the lower classes (servants, families of priests, industrial workers and peasants), the new generation of the Ukrainian elite often lacked the opportunity for systematic education because of war, famine and the need to earn their daily bread. Working "on the brink of the possible", using every opportunity to get in contact with world culture and to spread the wings of their creativity, the new generation of the Ukrainian artistic elite were imbued with the latest trends and created truly topical art.

At this time a new generation arose, bearing the moral burden of victories and defeats in the struggle for national independence, with an understanding of Ukraine's path in world history, independent in its judgements, with diverse ideas about the development of Ukrainian literature, when, according to Solomiia Pavlychko, literature

“got a much wider audience than ever before. The level of education of this audience has increased. For the first time, a large number of writers and intellectuals worked in literature. For the first time Ukrainian scientists spoke to the audience of national universities. For the first time different artistic directions, groups, and schools were rapidly differentiated. However, the tendency for the modernization of cultural life coexisted from the outset with a parallel tendency for its subordination to ideology and then to complete destruction."

Literary groups 

For the most part writers were consolidated into literary organizations with different styles or positions. The period between 1925 and 1928 saw a "literary discussion" initiated by Mykola Khvylovy. One of its objects was to determine the ways in which the new Ukrainian Soviet literature would develop and define the role of the writer in society. Khvylovy and his associates supported an orientation towards West European rather than Russian culture; they rejected "red graphomania" but did not reject Communism as a political ideology.

The main literary organizations of that time were:
 Hart (hardening) existed from 1923 to 1925. Its main goal was uniting of all kinds of proletarian artists with further development of proletarian culture. One of the requirements of "Hart" was using of Ukrainian language. The organization ceased to exist after the death of its leader Vasyl Ellan-Blakytny.
 VAPLITE ("The Free Academy of Proletarian Literature") was created in 1926 by Mykola Khvylovy on the base of "Hart". Its goal was to create a new Ukrainian literature by adopting the best achievements of Western European culture. VAPLITE accepted Communism as political ideology but rejected the necessity for ideological meaning in literature as its main requirement Among the members of VAPLITE were Oleksandr Dovzhenko, Mykola Kulish, Les Kurbas, Mayk Johansen, Pavlo Tychyna, Oleksa Slisarenko, Mykola Bazhan, Yuriy Smolych and Yulian Shpol.
 MARS ("The Workshop of Revolutionary Literature") existed from 1924 to 1929 (primarily under name of "Lanka"). The main postulate of MARS was to honestly and artistically describe that epoch. Among its members were Valerian Pidmohylny, Hryhorii Kosynka, Yevhen Pluzhnyk, Borys Antonenko-Davydovych, Todos Osmachka, Ivan Bahrianyi and Maria Halych.
 Aspanfut, later Komunkult was an organization of Ukrainian futurists. Their values were "Communism, Internationalism, Industrialism, Rationalization, Inventions and Quality". Among its members were Mykhayl Semenko, Heo Shkurupiy, Yuriy Yanovsky and Yulian Shpol.
 The Neo-Classicists were a literary movement of modernists among whose followers were Mykola Zerov, Maksym Rylsky, Pavlo Fylypovych and Mykhailo Drai-Khmara. They never established a formal organization or programme, but shared cultural and aesthetic interests. The Neo-Classicists were concerned with the production of high art and disdained "mass art", didactic writing, and propagandistic work.
 Pluh (plough), an organization of rural writers. Their main postulate was the "struggle against proprietary ideology among peasants and promotion of the Proletarian Revolution's ideals". Among its members were Serhiy Pylypenko, Petro Panch, Dokiia Humenna and Andrii Holovko.
Zakhidna Ukraina after April 1926 it separated from Pluh as an independent literary organization of fifty writers and artists from West Ukraine based in Kyiv, Odesa, Dnipro and Poltava. Headed first by Dmytro Zagul, later by Myroslav Irchan.

Innovation 
The writers of the Ukrainian (Red) Renaissance divided prose in two: plot (narrative) prose and non-plot prose. In the non-plot works, it was not the sentence or the word that was paramount, but the subtext, the spirit, or as Khvylovyi put it, the "smell of the word". The style of strong feelings and penetration of phenomena is called "neo-romanticism" or "expressionism". Among the many Ukrainian-language authors working in this style were Mykola Khvylovy ("Julia Shpol"), Yurii Yanovsky, Andrii Holovko, Oleksa Vlyko, Les Kurbas and Mykola Kulish.

The main themes of Khvylovy's novel Ya (Romantyka) (I am (romance)) are disappointment in the Revolution, and the screaming contradictions and divided nature of human beings at that time. The main character is  without a name, and therefore without personality or soul. For the sake of the Revolution he murders his mother and then reproves himself: "Was the Revolution worth such a sacrifice?"

In Valeryan Pidmogylny's novel The City, for the first time in Ukrainian literature, elements of existentialism emerged. In pursuit of pleasure its protagonist advances from the satisfaction of his physical desires to the highest religious needs. Even with such a complex subject matter, however, the author does not turn his novel into a simple narrative of "people's" philosophy, but grasps it creatively in its application to a national worldview.

In the Ukrainian-language poetry of the time, the most interesting development is the quest pursued by the Symbolists Olexandr Oles and Pavlo Tychyna. In The Clarinets of the Sun, Tychyna reflected the breadth of an educated and subtle mind contemplating the richness of his national heritage and striving to uncover its root causes.

When the Communist Party of the USSR realized it could not control such writers , it began to use  impermissible methods of repression: it forced them into silence, subjected them to crushing public criticism, and arrested or executed them. Writers faced a choice between suicide (Khvylovyi in 1933) and the  concentration camps (Gulag) (B. Antonenko-Davidovich and Ostap Vyshnya); they could retreat into silence (Ivan Bahrianyi and V. Domontovich), leave Ukraine (V. Vynnychenko and Yevhen Malaniuk), or write works that glorified the Communist Party (P. Tychyna and Mykola Bazhan). Most artists of this brief Renaissance were arrested and imprisoned or shot.

Deportation, arrests, executions (1933–1938) 
In 1927, Stalin abolished the New Economic Policy and turned to the forced industrialisation and the collectivization of agriculture of the First Five-Year Plan. 

Changes in cultural politics also occurred. An early example was the 1930 show trial of the "Union for the Freedom of Ukraine" at which 45 intellectuals, higher education professors, writers, a theologian and a priest were publicly prosecuted in Kharkiv, then capital of Soviet Ukraine.  Fifteen of the accused were executed, many more with links to the defendants (248) were sent to the camps. (This was one of a series of contemporary show trials, held in the North Caucasus, 1929 in Shakhty, and in Moscow, the 1930 Industrial Party Trial and the 1931 Menshevik Trial.)

The systematic elimination of the Ukrainian intelligentsia dates back to May 1933 when Mykhailo Yalovyi was arrested; in response Mykola Khvylovy committed suicide in the "Slovo" (Word) Building in Kharkiv. The campaign ran from 1934 to 1940, reaching a peak during the Great Terror of 1937–1938. A total of 223 writers were arrested and in a number of cases imprisoned and shot. Almost three hundred representatives of the Ukrainian Renaissance of the 1920s and 1930s were shot between 27 October and 4 November 1937 at Sandarmokh, a massive killing field in Karelia (northwest Russia).

Some important representatives of this generation survived. Many remained in the Soviet Union: Oleksandr Dovzhenko, Pavlo Tychyna, Maksym Rylskyi, Borys Antonenko-Davydovych, Ostap Vyshnia, and Mykola Bazhan. A few emigrated: Ulas Samchuk, George Shevelov, and Ivan Bahrianyi.

The scale of the tragedy 
Exact figures for Ukrainian intellectuals imprisoned and executed during the Great Terror are not available. It is, by comparison, relatively straightfoward to determine how many writers were involved. The "Slovo" Association (Ukrainian writers in emigration) sent its assessment on 20 December 1954 to the Second All-Union Congress of Writers in the USSR: in 1930, works by 259 Ukrainian writers were in print; after 1938 only 36 writers were published (13.9% of the earlier total). According to "Slovo", 192 of the "missing" 223 writers were deported, sent to the Gulag or executed; a further 16 disappeared; and eight writers committed suicide.

These data are confirmed by The Altar of Sorrow (ed., Olexii Musiienko), a martyrology of Ukrainian writers, which numbers 246 writer-victims of Stalin's terror. Other sources indicate that 228 of 260 Ukrainian writers were deported, imprisoned or shot.

Writers, poets, artists, dramatists 
 Borys Antonenko-Davydovych (5 August 1899–8 May 1984) – writer, translator and linguist. (Well-known dissident writer.)
 Ivan Bahrianyi (2 October 1906–25 August 1963, West Germany) – writer, essayist, novelist and politician.
 Mykhailo Boychuk (30 October 1882–13 July 1937) – painter, most commonly known as a monumentalist.
 Hryhorii Epik (17 January 1901–3 November 1937) – writer and journalist; shot at Sandarmokh.
 Hnat Khotkevych (31 December 1877–8 October 1938) – writer, ethnographer, playwright, composer, musicologist and  bandura player; executed.
 Mykola Khvylovy (13 December 1893–13 May 1933) – prose writer and poet; committed suicide.
 Hryhoriy Kosynka (29 November 1899–15 December 1934) – writer and translator.
 Mykola Kulish (19 December 1892–3 November 1937) – prose writer and dramatist; shot at Sandarmokh.
 Les Kurbas (25 February 1887–3 November 1937) – film and theater director; shot at Sandarmokh.
 Valerian Pidmohylny (2 February 1901–3 November 1937) – prose writer; shot at Sandarmokh.
 Yevhen Pluzhnyk (26 December 1898—2 February 1936) – poet, playwright and translator; died on Solovki.
 Klym Polishchuk (25 November 1891– November 1937) – journalist, poet and prose writer; shot at Sandarmokh.
 Anton Prykhodko (1891-29 January 1938) – writer, statesman.
 Myroslava Sopilka (1897-1937) - poet, novelist. Shot in Kyiv.
 Liudmyla Starytska-Cherniakhivska (17 August 1868–1941) – writer, translator and literary critic; defendant at the Kharkiv show trial of the "Union for the Freedom of Ukraine" (1930). 
 Volodymyr Svidzinsky (9 October 1885-18 October 1941) – poet and translator.
 Mykhaylo Semenko (19 December 1892—24 October 1937) – poet, prominent representative of the futuristic Ukrainian poetry of the 1920s; ?shot at Sandarmokh.
 Mykhailo Yalovyi (5 June 1895-3 November 1937) – poet, prosaist and dramatist; shot at Sandarmokh.
 Maik Yohansen (pseudonyms: Willy Wetzelius and M. Kramar) (16 October 1895–27 October 1937) – poet, prose writer, dramatist, translator, critic and linguist; shot at Sandarmokh.
 Mykola Zerov (26 April 1890-3 November 1937) – poet, translator, classical and literary scholar and critic; shot at Sandarmokh.

See also 
 Anti-Ukrainian sentiment
 History of Ukrainian literature
 Sandarmokh (killing field and memorial complex, Karelia)
 Slovo Building (Kharkiv)
 Slovo House (2017 film)
 The Executed Renaissance Anthology, Kultura: Paris (1959)
 1937 mass execution of Belarusians
 Yurii Kerpatenko

References

Bibliography 
 Юрій Лавріненко. Розстріляне відродження: Антологія 1917–1933. — Київ: Смолоскип, 2004.
 Розстріляне Відродження
 Orest Subtelny. Ukraine: A History. University of Toronto Press, 2000 – 736 p.
Mace James Ernest. Communism and the Dilemmas of National Liberation: National Communism in Soviet Ukraine, 1918—1933 / James Earnest Mace, Harvard Ukrainian Research Institute, Ukrainian Academy of Arts and Sciences in the United States. Cambridge: Distributed by Harvard University Press for the Harvard Ukrainian Research Institute and the Ukrainian Academy of Arts and Sciences in the U.S., 1983. — 334 pp.
 Розстріляне Відродження

 
Anti-Ukrainian sentiment
Crimes of the communist regime in Ukraine against Ukrainians
Cultural history of Ukraine
History of Ukrainian literature
Interwar period
Theatre in Ukraine
Political repression in Ukraine
Political and cultural purges
Massacres of Ukrainians
Stalinism in Ukraine
Ukrainian poetry
Ukrainian Soviet Socialist Republic